Panathinaikos is a major Greek multi-sport club based in Athens. 

Panathinaikos is a Greek term (pan- + athinaikos, meaning 'all-Athenian'), which may also refer to:
Panathinaikos F.C., football team
Panathinaikos B.C., basketball team
Panathinaikos Chicago, American soccer club
Panathinaikos Movement, Greek political party

See also
Panathinaikos F.C. New Stadium, football stadium under construction in Athens